Kristin Heidi Elisabeth Moe (born 25 November 1954) is a Norwegian politician for the Conservative Party.

She was born in Asker. She directed the Norwegian Consumer Council from 1984 to 1993. She was also elected to Asker municipal council in 1983, and worked as city commissioner's secretary in Oslo from 1986 to 1987. She was a deputy member of the Norwegian Parliament during the term 1989–1993.

References

1954 births
Living people
Conservative Party (Norway) politicians
Deputy members of the Storting
Akershus politicians
Women members of the Storting
Directors of government agencies of Norway
Asker politicians